Pueblo County ( or  ) is a county located in the U.S. state of Colorado. As of the 2020 census, the population was 168,162. The county seat is Pueblo. The county was named for the historic city of Pueblo which took its name from the Spanish language word meaning "town" or "village". Pueblo County comprises the Pueblo, CO Metropolitan Statistical Area.

Geography

Adjacent counties

El Paso County - north
Lincoln County - northeast
Crowley County - east
Otero County - east
Las Animas County - south
Huerfano County - southwest
Custer County - west
Fremont County - northwest

Major Highways
  Interstate 25
  U.S. Highway 50
  U.S. Highway 85
  State Highway 10
  State Highway 45
  State Highway 47
  State Highway 78
  State Highway 96
  State Highway 120
  State Highway 165
  State Highway 167

National protected areas
San Isabel National Forest
Greenhorn Mountain Wilderness

Trails and byways
American Discovery Trail
Frontier Pathways National Scenic and Historic Byway
TransAmerica Trail Bicycle Route
Western Express Bicycle Route

Demographics

As of the Census 2007 statistical update, there were 154,712 people, 59,956 households, and 40,084 families living in the county.  The population density was 59 people per square mile (23/km2).  There were 67,314 housing units at an average density of 25 per square mile (10/km2).  The racial makeup of the county was 79.47% White, 1.90% Black or African American, 1.59% Native American, 0.65% Asian, 0.07% Pacific Islander, 12.93% from other races, and 3.38% from two or more races.  37.97% of the population were Hispanic or Latino of any race. 11.6% were of German, 8.8% Italian, 6.7% English, 6.6% American and 6.5% Irish ancestry.

There were 59,956 households, out of which 31.50% had children under the age of 18 living with them, 50.10% were married couples living together, 13.30% had a female householder with no husband present, and 31.60% were non-families. 26.60% of all households were made up of individuals, and 11.10% had someone living alone who was 65 years of age or older.  The average household size was 2.52 and the average family size was 3.04.

In the county, the population was spread out, with 25.80% under the age of 18, 9.40% from 18 to 24, 27.20% from 25 to 44, 22.40% from 45 to 64, and 15.20% who were 65 years of age or older.  The median age was 37 years. For every 100 females there were 95.80 males.  For every 100 females age 18 and over, there were 92.50 males.

The median income for a household in the county was $41,283, and the median income for a family was $50,143. The per capita income for the county was $21,656.  About 11.20% of families and 14.90% of the population were below the poverty line, including 19.70% of those under age 18 and 8.70% of those age 65 or over.

Government

The Board of Pueblo County Commissioners is elected by voters to represent three individual districts within Pueblo County. The board serves as the administrative and policy-setting authority for Pueblo County.

Pueblo County is part of Colorado's 3rd congressional district and is represented by U.S. House member Lauren Boebert.

At the state level the following representatives have boundaries that cover parts of Pueblo County:  Nick Hinrichsen representing Senate District 3, Cleave Simpson representing Senate District 35, House Majority Caucus Chair Daneya Esgar representing District 46, Stephanie Luck representing District 47, and Donald Valdez representing District 62.

Law enforcement

The sheriff's office is responsible for law enforcement and fire protection for unincorporated area in the county.  the department had 362 sworn members.

Politics
Pueblo County is historically a Democratic stronghold; however, in the 2016 presidential election, the county voted for Republican nominee Donald Trump. It was brought back into the Democratic fold in the years which followed, voting for Jared Polis in the 2018 gubernatorial election and giving Joe Biden a plurality in the 2020 presidential election, although Biden's margin of victory of 1.7 percent was much reduced from Barack Obama's 14 percent margin in 2012.

Communities

City
Pueblo

Towns
Boone
Rye

Census-designated places
Avondale
Beulah Valley
Blende
Colorado City
Pueblo West
Salt Creek
Vineland

Education
School districts serving the county include:
 Pueblo School District 60
 Pueblo County School District 70 
 Edison School District 54-JT
 Fowler School District R-4J

Pueblo County has thirteen high schools.

Recreation

Rosemount Museum
Sangre de Cristo Arts and Conference Center
Buell Children's Museum
El Pueblo History Museum
Pueblo Weisbrod Aircraft Museum
Steelworks Museum
Lake Pueblo State Park
Nature and Wildlife Discovery Center
Pueblo Zoo
Pueblo City Park Carousel
Arkansas River kayak course
Historic Arkansas Riverwalk
Union Avenue Historic Commercial District
Pueblo City-County Library District

See also

Outline of Colorado
Index of Colorado-related articles
Arapahoe County, Kansas Territory
El Paso County, Jefferson Territory
Colorado census statistical areas
Front Range Urban Corridor
National Register of Historic Places listings in Pueblo County, Colorado
Saint Charles Reservoir

References

External links

Pueblo County Geographic Information Systems website

Colorado County Evolution by Don Stanwyck
Colorado Historical Society

 

 
Colorado counties
1861 establishments in Colorado Territory
Eastern Plains
Populated places established in 1861